Stratton is a surname. Notable people with the surname include:

 Addams Stratton McAllister (1875–1946), US electrical engineer and editor
 Allan Stratton, Canadian author
 Allegra Stratton (born 1980), British journalist and writer
 Anne Stratton (1887-1977), American composer
 Arthur Stratton (1911-1975), American author, traveller and OSS agent
 Ben Stratton, Australian rules footballer
 Brian Stratton, Mayor of Schenectady, New York
 Casey Stratton (born 1976), US musician
 Charles C. Stratton (1796–1859), US politician
 Charles Sherwood Stratton (1838–1883), US circus performer under the stage name General Tom Thumb
 Chris Stratton (born 1990), American baseball player
 David Stratton (born 1939), Australian film critic and television personality
 Dennis Stratton (born 1954), British guitarist
 Dorothy C. Stratton (1899–2006), director of US Coast Guard women's reserve
 Ellen Stratton (born 1939), US model
 Evelyn Lundberg Stratton (born 1953), Supreme Court of Ohio Justice
 Felton Stratton (1895–1974), American baseball player
 F.J.M. Stratton (1881–1960), British astrophysicist
 Fred Stratton (1913–2001), British physician and medical researcher
 Gene Stratton Porter (1863–1924), US author, screenwriter and naturalist
 George M. Stratton (1865–1957), US psychologist
 Gil Stratton (1922–2008), US actor and sportscaster
 Grace Stratton (born 1999), New Zealand blogger and fashion entrepreneur
 Hal Stratton, chairman of the US Consumer Product Safety Commission, 2002
 Harold M. Stratton, founder of Briggs & Stratton
 Helen Stratton, (1867–1961), English artist and illustrator
 James Robert Stratton, Irish-Canadian politician
 John Stratton (disambiguation), multiple people
 Julius Adams Stratton (1901–1994), US educator and President of MIT
 Kim Stratton (born 1961), American gospel musician
 Lois Stratton (1927–2020), American politician
 Margaret Stratton (born 1953), US photographer and video artist.
 Mary Chase Perry Stratton (1867–1961), US ceramic artist
 Michael Stratton, British clinical scientist
 Mike Stratton (born 1941), US football player
 Monty Stratton (1912–1982), US baseball player
 Richard Stratton (CCC), US educator
 Richard A. Stratton, USN., former P.O.W.
 Rick Stratton, Make-up artist
 Samuel S. Stratton (1916–1990), US politician
 Samuel Somerville Stratton
 Samuel Wesley Stratton (1861–1931), US educator and President of MIT
 Solomon Stratton (1785–1818), US explorer
 Terry Stratton (born 1938), Canadian politician
 Tony Stratton-Smith (1933–1987), English music manager, entrepreneur and founder of Charisma Records
 William Stratton (1914–2001), US politician
 W. K. Stratton, American writer
 W. K. Stratton (actor) (born 1950), American film and television actor
 W. S. Stratton (1848–1902), US gold prospector and philanthropist
 John Berkeley, 1st Baron Berkeley of Stratton (1602–1678)

See also
Straton (disambiguation)
Strutton

English toponymic surnames